Savage is a passenger rail station on the MARC Camden Line between Union Station and Baltimore's Camden Station. It is officially located at 9009 Dorsey Run Road in Savage, Maryland, however Dorsey Run Road runs over the railroad tracks as well as Brock Bridge Road, which runs along the south side of the tracks and is a street-level with the station. The station straddles the line between Howard County and Anne Arundel County, with the southbound platform and parking garage located in Howard County and the northbound platform in Anne Arundel County.

Savage station runs along the former Baltimore and Ohio Railroad's Capital Subdivision, which is now owned by CSX. It is also near the former Annapolis Junction which included a former Baltimore and Annapolis Railroad line.

Nearby places and attractions

Communities
 Annapolis Junction
 Savage
 Fort Meade

Employment centers
 National Security Agency
 National Cryptologic Museum
 Giant-Landover Jessup Fresh Food Facility
 Regional Transportation Agency of Central Maryland
 National Business Park
 Dorsey Run Road Businesses

Station layout
The station has two side platforms and a parking garage adjacent to the southbound platform. The station is compliant with the Americans with Disabilities Act of 1990.

References

External links
 
 Station from Dorsey Run Road from Google Maps Street View

1989 establishments in Maryland
Camden Line
MARC Train stations
Railway stations in the United States opened in 1989